

Mughal Empire
Patlipura – Azim-us-Shan

Oman
 Mombasa – Nasr ibn Abdallah al-Mazru‘i, Wali of Mombasa (1698–1728)

Ottoman Empire
 Principality of Abkhazia – Jigetshi (1700–1730)

Portugal
 Angola – 
 Bernardino de Tavora de Sousa Távares, Governor of Angola (1701–1702)
 Military junta (1702–1705)
 Macau –
 Diogo de Melo Sampaio, Governor of Macau (1700–1702)
 Pedro Vaz de Sequeira, Governor of Macau (1702–1703)

Colonial governors
Colonial governors
1702